Gemmulimitra hansturneri is a species of sea snail, a marine gastropod mollusk in the family Mitridae, the miters or miter snails.

Description
The length of the shell attains 11.65 mm.

Distribution
This marine species occurs off Mactan Island, the Philippines.

References

Guillot de Suduiraut E. & Guillot de Suduiraut E. 2009. Description d'une nouvelle espèce de Mitra (Gastropoda : Mitridae : Mitrinae) des Philippines. Novapex 10(3): 115-117

External links
 Fedosov A., Puillandre N., Herrmann M., Kantor Yu., Oliverio M., Dgebuadze P., Modica M.V. & Bouchet P. (2018). The collapse of Mitra: molecular systematics and morphology of the Mitridae (Gastropoda: Neogastropoda). Zoological Journal of the Linnean Society. 183(2): 253-337

hansturneri
Gastropods described in 2009